Arab World has two adaptations of the singing competition Pop Idol under two different titles and on two different networks:
 Super Star سوبر ستار, which was aired between 2003 and 2008 on Future Television
 Arab Idol, which premiered in December 2011 on MBC 1

Idols (franchise)
Television series by Fremantle (company)
Lebanese television series
2000s Lebanese television series
2010s Lebanese television series